Kuala Berang is a state constituency in Terengganu, Malaysia. It is currently represented in the Terengganu State Legislative Assembly.

History
2004–2016: The constituency contains the polling districts of Getang, Pasir Tinggi, Sungai Ular, Tanggul, Bandar Kuala Berang, Bukit Tok Bat, Telaga, Tanjung Putat, Langgar, Kampung Buluh, Tapu.

2016–present: The constituency contains the polling districts of Getang, Pasir Tinggi, Sungai Ular, Tanggul, Bandar Kuala Berang, Bukit Tok Bat, Telaga, Tanjung Putat, Langgar, Kampung Buluh, Tapu, Sungai Petai, Tajin.

Representation history

Demographics

Election results

References

Terengganu state constituencies